Manasaare was an Indian Kannada language soap opera which premiered on 24 February 2020 in Udaya TV and ended on 13 November 2021. The show stars  Priyanka Chincholi and Sujay Hegde in lead roles.  It is the remake of the Telugu serial Pournami.

Plot
The story revolves around an innocent elder daughter Prarthana, the protagonist of the show, who has been waiting for years to get the love of her father. All that she wishes for and wants in life is her father's love. However, she is fortunate enough as she only gets unconditional love from her stepmother who treats her as her own flesh and blood.

Cast

Main
Priyanka Chincholi as Prarthana Yuvaraj
Sagar Biligowda / Sujay Hegde as Yuvaraj (Yuva)

Supporting
Suneel Puranik / Harish as Anand Mahendra
Swathi as Devaki Anand 
Prakruthi Prasad as Pavani 
Unknown / Charith Balappa as Ram Charan
Chitkala Biradar as Damayanti 
Yamuna Srinidhi as Vasuki
Rajalakshmi as Prathana's grandmother 
Yamuna Srinidhi as Kausalya Anand (Died in serial)
Sunethra Pandit as Vajramma 
Ramesh Pandit 
Vijay Koundinya as Bhoopathi

Cameo appearance
Rishi as himself

Adaptations

Crossover and special episodes
From 7 September 2020 to 11 September 2020 and from 6 May 2021 to 26 May 2021 it had a Mahasangama with Kavyanjali.
From 4 January 2021 to 9 January 2021, it aired a one-hour special episode.
Again from 14 April 2021 to 17 April 2021 it had a crossover with Kavyanjali for Yuva and Prathana marriage episodes.

References

2020 Indian television series debuts
Udaya TV original programming
Kannada-language television shows